Three ships of the Turkish Navy have borne the name TCG Sultanhisar, after Sultanhisar, a town and a small district of Aydın Province, Turkey:

  was a torpedo boat launched in 1907 for service with the Ottoman Navy. She was transferred to the successor navy and struck in 1935.
  was a  launched in 1940 and decommissioned in 1960.
She was transferred to Turkey in 1964 and was decommissioned in 2002.

Turkish Navy ship names